Waltham Abbey SSSI is a  biological Site of Special Scientific Interest which is located within the Waltham Abbey Royal Gunpowder Mills at Waltham Abbey in Essex.

History 
For 300 years the area was cut off from its surroundings by river boundaries and the highly secret nature of its work. The site was finally closed in 1991. Decontamination work was carried out between 1992-96 and the site opened to the public in 2001.

Location 
The woodland site lies to the north of the present day Gunpowder Mills and is bounded by the River Lee Flood Relief Channel to the north and west while the Cornmill Stream forms its eastern boundary.

Description 
The site is alder woodland on damp soils, with other trees including sycamore, ash and crack willow. The trees were planted around 1700 to provide charcoal for the manufacture of gunpowder, and planting ceased at the time of the First World War. The wood has the largest heronry in Essex, which was present in 1974 and had 26 pairs in 1984. Other birds include tawny owls, tree sparrows, reed warblers, sedge warblers and blackcaps.

Access
Access is from Beaulieu Drive and there is a charge for entry.

Public transport 
Rail
 Waltham Cross railway station

References

External links 
The Gun Powder Mills- a history
Royal Gunpowder Mills: History and heritage

Sites of Special Scientific Interest in Essex
Sites of Special Scientific Interest notified in 1986
Nature reserves in Essex
Lee Valley Park
Waltham Abbey